Por mis pistolas ("By My Pistols") is a 1938 Mexican comedy drama film directed, co-produced and co-written by José Bohr and starring Sara García.

Cast
Sara García
Fernando Soler
Domingo Soler
Carmelita Bohr
Julián Soler
Guillermo Cantú Robert
Georgette Somohano
Ángel T. Sala
Narciso Busquets
Pepita González
Ernesto Finance
Aurora Walker
María Porras
Eusebio Pirrín
Paco Martínez
Pepe Martínez

References

External links

1938 comedy-drama films
Mexican black-and-white films
Mexican comedy-drama films
Films directed by José Bohr
1938 films
1930s Spanish-language films
1930s Mexican films